Norbert Dobeleit (born 17 July 1964) is a German television personality and retired athlete. During his active career he represented West Germany and specialized in the 200 and 400 metres.

Biography
Dobeleit was born in Renchen, Baden-Württemberg. At the 1987 World Championships he placed fifth in 4 x 100 metres relay and fourth in 4x400 metres relay. At the 1988 Summer Olympics held in Seoul, South Korea he helped win the 4 x 400 metres relay bronze medal with his teammates Edgar Itt, Jörg Vaihinger and Ralf Lübke.

He won the 400 m race at the 1990 European Indoor Championships, and at the 1990 European Championships he finished fifth in 400 m and second in 4 × 400 m relay with teammates Klaus Just, Edgar Itt and Carsten Köhrbrück.

His personal best time was 20.43 seconds, achieved in July 1987 in Rhede. This ranks him ninth among German 200 m sprinters, behind Tobias Unger, Frank Emmelmann, Sebastian Ernst, Eugen Ray, Jürgen Evers, Ralf Lübke, Bernhard Hoff and Hans-Joachim Zenk.

After retiring he has worked as a television presenter in the German media.

Norbert Dobeleit was married to Swiss television presenter Tamara Sedmak and they have a son named Julius, born in June 2011. They are now separated.

References

External links
 
 
 

1964 births
Living people
People from Ortenaukreis
West German male sprinters
Athletes (track and field) at the 1988 Summer Olympics
Olympic athletes of West Germany
Olympic bronze medalists for West Germany
German television presenters
European Athletics Championships medalists
Medalists at the 1988 Summer Olympics
Olympic bronze medalists in athletics (track and field)
Sportspeople from Freiburg (region)